James Strong (October 6, 1783 – August 8, 1847) was a United States representative from New York.

Biography
Strong was born in Windham, Connecticut on October 6, 1783.  In 1806 he graduated from the University of Vermont in Burlington, Vermont, afterwards moving to Hudson, New York.

Strong studied law, became an attorney in 1810, and practiced in Hudson.  He served in local offices, including member of the Columbia County Board of Supervisors, alderman for the city of Hudson, and the judicial position of master in chancery.  He also served in the New York Militia as judge advocate of the 12th Brigade.

He was elected as Federalist to the 16th United States Congress (March 4, 1819 – March 3, 1821).

He was elected as an Adams-Clay Federalist to the 18th United States Congress, reelected as an Adams candidate to the 19th and 20th United States Congress, and reelected as an Anti-Jacksonian to the 21st United States Congress (March 4, 1823 – March 3, 1831). Strong was chairman of the Committee on Territories in the 19th and 20th Congresses.

In 1824 Strong received the honorary degree of Master of Arts from the University of Vermont.  He later relocated to New York City, and he died in Chester, New Jersey on August 8, 1847.  Strong never married and had no children.

References

External links

1783 births
1847 deaths
University of Vermont alumni
People from Windham, Connecticut
People from Hudson, New York
New York (state) lawyers
New York (state) National Republicans
Federalist Party members of the United States House of Representatives from New York (state)
National Republican Party members of the United States House of Representatives
19th-century American politicians
19th-century American lawyers